A beer bong is a device composed of a funnel attached to a tube used to facilitate the rapid consumption of beer. The use of a beer bong is also known as funneling.

Construction 
The typical construction of a beer bong involves a large funnel connected to tubing. Beers are stockpiled in the funnel and as the user drinks, the beer will pour down the tubing. Beer bongs often have valves to engage/disengage the flow of beer.

Use

Typical oral 

One person holds a clear pipe to their mouth, while a second holds the other end of the pipe with a large plastic funnel attached.  The pipe is part-filled with beer, with the remainder of the pipe and the bottom of the funnel filling with a foamy head.

Drinking from a beer bong is different from drinking beer normally (or other carbonated beverage). This is because the drinker is not in control of the volume of liquid entering the mouth. In addition, the force of gravity pushes the beer into the drinker's mouth and thus 'forces' the beer down. It is for this reason the beer bong often engages the gag reflex.

The beer bong is either 'hit' or 'chugged'. A hit from the beer bong is when a valve is used and one drinks as much beer as they can before turning off the valve. Chugging is where an entire, or a number of beers are consumed in one use. A popular technique is to 'open' the esophagus and simply allow the beer to flow down. This takes practice and may cause pain in trying it for the first time.

Alternate rectal 
Occasionally the pipe is inserted rectally to administer an alcohol enema.  Called butt-chugging or boofing, this method of alcohol consumption can be dangerous or even deadly because it leads to faster intoxication since the alcohol is absorbed directly into the bloodstream and bypasses the body's ability to reject the toxin by vomiting.

In popular culture 
Beer bongs came to national attention in the US after a photograph of Senator John Kerry being offered one at an Iowa University tailgate party made national newspaper front pages.

See also

List of drinking games

References

External links

Beer vessels and serving
Drinking games